Steven Pallos (born 1902 in Budapest) was an Austro-Hungarian Empire-born British film producer.

Partial filmography
 Call of the Blood (1949)
 Hotel Sahara (1951)
 The Fake (1953)
 The Diamond (1954)
 The Master Plan (1955)
 Before I Wake (1955)
 Sail into Danger (1957)
 Jet Storm (1959)
 Foxhole in Cairo (1960)
 The Hands of Orlac (1960)
 Where the Spies Are (1965)
 Naked Evil (1966)
 Captain Nemo and the Underwater City (1969)
 The Three Musketeers (1974)

References

External links

1902 births
Year of death missing
Film people from Budapest
British film producers
Hungarian emigrants to the United Kingdom